The Ice Warriors are a fictional extraterrestrial race of reptilian humanoids in the long-running British science fiction television series Doctor Who. They were originally created by Brian Hayles, first appearing in the 1967 serial The Ice Warriors where they encountered the Second Doctor and his companions Jamie and Victoria. In Doctor Who, the Ice Warriors originated on Mars, which within the series narrative is a dying world. Their early appearances depict the Ice Warriors as attempting to conquer the Earth and escape their planet as early as Earth's Ice Age. A frozen group are discovered by an Earth scientific team who dub them 'Ice Warriors' in their first appearance. Despite this not being the name of their species, an Ice Lord later refers to his soldiers as Ice Warriors in the 1974 serial The Monster of Peladon. Similarly there is a fleeting reference to themselves as such in The Curse of Peladon. Although originally appearing as villains, subsequent appearances have depicted Ice Warriors that have eschewed violence and even ally themselves with the Doctor. They have also been featured in flashback and cameo appearances, in addition to appearing frequently in spin-off media such as novels and audio releases.

Serials were planned for both 1986 and 1990 that were to have featured the Ice Warriors: Mission to Magnus featuring the Sixth Doctor and the villain Sil, and Ice Time featuring the Seventh Doctor. In both instances, the series was placed on a hiatus and the serials scrapped; however, Mission to Magnus was novelised by Target and adapted as an audio drama by Big Finish, as was Ice Time, retitled Thin Ice in audio form.

The Ice Warriors returned in the revived series in the seventh series episode "Cold War" (2013) and the tenth series episode "Empress of Mars" (2017).

Creation

The fourth season of Doctor Who ended with The Evil of the Daleks, a serial intended to retire the Daleks from the series; their creator Terry Nation intended to produce a spin-off in America. The production office was keen to find new recurring monsters to be used instead of the retired Daleks and alongside the popular Cybermen. Brian Hayles was approached to create a suitable monster that could be used as a new recurring antagonist for the Doctor. He drew from newspaper reports of a baby mammoth found in 1900 in the Siberian ice, and from his interest in Mars, to create his monster. James Chapman suggests that director Derek Martinus drew from the Christian Nyby film The Thing from Another World in realising Hayles' scripts, particularly the concept of an alien frozen in ice near an isolated science base.

Hayles had envisioned the Ice Warriors as cybernetic creatures, but designer Martin Baugh, fearing comparisons to the established Cybermen, instead designed costumes with vaguely reptilian features. After their first appearance, in 1967's The Ice Warriors, they were a success and were brought back in 1969 for a second serial. Peter Bryant, the producer of Doctor Who by 1969, also felt that a second appearance might better justify the expensive Ice Warrior costumes employed in their debut serial.

Physical characteristics
Martin Baugh was the costume designer for The Ice Warriors and was responsible for the decision to make the Ice Warriors reptilian humanoids. As a costume designer, Baugh preferred to work with new materials, with Piers D Britton and Graham Sleight noting that, in designing the look of the monsters, Baugh crafted the armour from fibreglass. Sleight further comments that the sculpting of this armour is reflective of crocodile skin, suggesting their reptilian nature.

Actors like Bernard Bresslaw (who portrayed the Ice Warrior Varga in their first appearance) used a sibilant whisper to demonstrate both the reptilian qualities of the monsters as well as to suggest that the Martian atmosphere is composed differently from that of Earth. The hissing voice is believed to have been developed by Bresslaw. Ice Warriors also have sonic weaponry built into their wrists. The Seeds of Death introduces an officer caste often referred to as Ice Lords. They are less armoured than their soldier counterparts and lack their mounted sonic weaponry. Common to both the Ice Warriors and Ice Lords are claw-like gloves.

For the return of the characters in 2013's "Cold War", these became three-fingered gloves, similar to another Doctor Who alien, the Sontarans.

Neill Gorton chose to make the creatures appear "beefier and stronger", redesigning the Ice Warrior armour to resemble plating. Urethane rubber was used, which is more flexible and comfortable than fibreglass. Mark Gatiss says that he insisted on remaining true to the original Ice Warriors design for their return appearance.

"Cold War" also depicts an Ice Warrior removing its armour for the first time within the series, something that the Doctor says is the ultimate disgrace for an Ice Warrior. The episode does not feature an entirely unclothed Ice Warrior; however it includes shots of clawed hands in scenes that some reviewers have compared with Alien, in addition to a revealing of the Ice Warrior's face during the episode's climax. "Cold War" also reveals that the Ice Warrior armour is a bio-mechanical shell intended to protect the Ice Warrior from the cold; as a cold-blooded species, they are susceptible to temperature fluctuations. The shell can be controlled remotely using sonic technology.

History
The Ice Warriors first appeared in the 1967 story The Ice Warriors, set during a future ice age in the year 3000. A scientific team sent to halt the advance of the glaciers discovers a spacecraft buried underneath the ice, where it has lain for thousands of years together with its Ice Warrior crew. The Martians are revived and attempt to take over the scientific base, but are defeated by the Second Doctor (Patrick Troughton) and their ship destroyed as it tries to take off.

They returned in the 1969 serial The Seeds of Death, which takes place in the mid-21st century. In this story, the world has grown dependent on the matter transmission system T-Mat, which an Ice Warrior strike forces intends to exploit to conquer Earth. After seizing the T-Mat relay on the Moon, they use it to send seeds that are intended to reduce the atmosphere's oxygen, resembling the Martian atmosphere and making the Earth hospitable for Martian life. This plan is foiled by the Second Doctor and his companions Jamie (Frazer Hines) and Zoe (Wendy Padbury), and the invading Martian fleet is sent into an orbit around the Sun.

When the Ice Warriors returned in 1972, in The Curse of Peladon, it was decided by the production team to subvert the audience's expectations, featuring them as allies of the Third Doctor (Jon Pertwee) rather than villains. The serial depicts the Ice Warriors having renounced violence and become members of a Galactic Federation that, besides Mars, also includes Earth, Alpha Centauri and Arcturus. They had been sent as members of a delegation to negotiate for the planet Peladon to join the Federation, where the Third Doctor encounters them after he and his companion Jo Grant (Katy Manning) are mistaken for the delegates from Earth. The Doctor initially suspects that the Ice Warriors are behind attempted sabotage to the proceedings; however, he accepts that the Ice Warriors have changed when they save his life. With the help of the Ice Warriors, the Doctor uncovers a plot by the High Priest, Hepesh (Geoffrey Toone), and the delegation from Arcturus, a world which is an old enemy of Mars, each with their own motives, to prevent Peladon's admission to the Federation.

A sequel, The Monster of Peladon, aired in 1974 and was set 50 years after the events of The Curse of Peladon. Here, the Ice Warriors are depicted serving as Federation peacekeeping troops. The Ice Lord Azaxyr, however, leader of this force, was working with Galaxy 5, which was at war with the Federation. Seeking a return to the race's warrior past, he tried to impose martial law and take over Peladon but was stopped by the Peladonians, who were aided by the Third Doctor.

As popular recurring monsters, the Ice Warriors have appeared in flashbacks and been referred to throughout the series history. During the Second Doctor's trial during The War Games, he lists the Ice Warriors as among many threats he has defended the universe against. During the Third Doctor serial The Mind of Evil, when forced to confront his fears by the Keller Machine, he sees images of his past enemies, including the Ice Warriors. The newly-regenerated Fifth Doctor (Peter Davison), during a moment of initial instability, makes mention of the Ice Warriors and the Brigadier in the 1981 serial Castrovalva. This has been seen as perhaps alluding to an unseen adventure. When confronted by alien sentient water in the 2009 episode "The Waters of Mars", the Tenth Doctor (David Tennant) theorizes that the Ice Warriors froze it in an underground glacier to prevent its escape, testing the virus by addressing it in Ancient North Martian as it reacts to his words, referring to them as "a fine and noble race who built an empire out of snow".

The 2013 episode "Cold War" is the first to depict the Ice Warriors in the revived series and features the Eleventh Doctor (Matt Smith) encountering Grand Marshal Skaldak, a legendary warrior who had been trapped in the ice for 5000 years, on a sunken Soviet submarine. It is also the first televised story to depict an Ice Warrior without its armour. After Skaldak escapes from the ice, the crew manage to subdue him, which under Martian Law he believes is a declaration of war by humanity. After failing to communicate with his fleet for rescue or reinforcements, Skaldak leaves his armour and tears apart crew members to forensically study the weaknesses of human anatomy. One crew member, Stepashin (Tobias Menzies), reveals to Skaldak that the submarine is armed with nuclear missiles that could destroy the planet. Upon returning to his armour, Skaldak prepares to fire the missiles. However, he relents and is rescued by an Ice Warrior spaceship that pulls the submarine through the ice to the surface. Before the spaceship leaves, Skaldak deactivates the warheads.

The Ice Warriors reappear alongside the Twelfth Doctor in the 2017 episode "Empress of Mars," featuring the first female Ice Warrior. While female Ice Warriors have been mentioned before, this marks their first onscreen appearance. In the episode, a crew of soldiers in the Victorian era help an Ice Warrior who they nickname Friday get home after his crashed ship is salvaged and he is awoken from suspended animation, only for him to discover the planet is dead. Friday awakens the Ice Queen, Iraxxa, who wants to kill the humans. Despite a rebellion by one of the soldiers, Colonel Godsacre, the mission's true commander, negotiates his death as long as she spares the rest of his men and the Earth. Iraxxa is impressed with his bravery, and offers him the chance to join their ranks. Iraxxa awakens several dormant Ice Warriors, and the Doctor calls the Galactic Federation's Alpha Centauri to pick up the remaining Ice Warriors, realizing this is the beginning of the Ice Warrior golden age.

Other appearances

Prose
Target released a novelisation of Mission to Magnus in 1990 written by Phillip Martin. This is based on a serial intended for Season 23, but this was scrapped after the series was put on an 18-month hiatus in March 1985. The novel features the Ice Warriors allying themselves with the villain Sil and facing the Sixth Doctor and Peri. They intend to move the planet Magnus Epsilon away from the sun, shifting it into a perpetual winter and turning it into their new home planet. After the Ice Warriors abandon Sil as unnecessary to the completion of their plans, he offers to help the Doctor and Peri defeat them. The Ice Warriors are ultimately destroyed when Magnus Epsilon returns to its original orbit.

After the cancellation of Doctor Who in 1989, Virgin Publishing secured a license to publish original Doctor Who fiction continuing the adventures of the Seventh Doctor. The Ice Warriors make several appearances in the Virgin New Adventures. The 1992 Ben Aaronovitch novel Transit is set after a war between humanity and the Ice Warriors called the "Thousand Day War" and depicts a war veteran, Old Sam, making a gesture of peace at the novel's conclusion. Craig Hinton's 1996 novel GodEngine novel follows on from this, depicting humans and Ice Warriors entering a new era of cooperation after the defeat of a faction allied with Daleks who had recently invaded the Earth. This novel also explores the influence of the Osirians on Martian culture. The titular GodEngine in particular is shown as an Ice Warrior creation using Osirian technology, with the Daleks intending on replacing the Earth's magnetic core with the GodEngine after an Ice Warrior faction has completed it.

Legacy by Gary Russell, released in 1994, is a sequel to the Peladon stories. It features the Doctor and Ice Warriors dispatched by the Galactic Federation to find a murderer hiding himself in the crowds of a Peladonian ceremony. The novel depicts a strained relationship between the Doctor and the Ice Warriors; he remains suspicious of their motives, and the Ice Lord Savaar is irritated by this suspicion. After the Doctor is implicated in murder, Savaar asks to personally execute the Doctor so as to avenge previous Ice Warrior defeats. The two manage to reconcile and work together to defeat the real killer. Savaar was among a group of Ice Warriors who later attended Bernice Summerfield's wedding in the 1996 novel Happy Endings by Paul Cornell.

The Dying Days depicts the Eighth Doctor preventing an Ice Warrior invasion in 1997, with the aid of the Brigadier and Bernice Summerfield. The novel reveals that, after the Mars Probe missions, depicted in the 1970 serial The Ambassadors of Death, Earth made inadvertent hostile contact with the Ice Warriors, which was covered up by British intelligence services. Lord Greyhaven, the minister in charge of the novel's missions to Mars, has been in contact with the Ice Warriors and aids in their take-over of the United Kingdom. Greyhaven is killed by the Ice Warriors after rethinking his actions and wiping out the Argyre Ice Warrior clan. The invasion attempt is ultimately defeated by the military.

The BBC Eighth Doctor Adventures novel The Last Resort features numerous conflicting alternate timelines in which the Martian race has either been enslaved by humans or else has exterminated all but a select human elite to prevent their enslavement. In these realities, Martian life began as a result of bacteria from the decaying corpses of millions of temporal duplicates of a time-travelling teenager called Jack Kowaczski, arriving from millions of parallel timelines on the uninhabitable surface of Mars and dying, changing the Martian atmosphere and evolving. With the timeline breaking down due to the temporal complications of the Martians' existence, the Doctor averts the existence of these Martians by going back in time and taking an infant version of Jack Kowaczski back in time to be raised somewhere he can never build his time machine.

The Past Doctor Adventures Fear Itself (which is set shortly after humans colonise Mars) mentions that native Martians (never named explicitly as Ice Warriors) have been forced into poverty and homelessness by humans, except for a few who have resorted to terrorism to reclaim their planet.

In 2011, as part of the New Series Adventures range, a novel called The Silent Stars Go By was released. It was written by Dan Abnett and features the Eleventh Doctor, together with companions Amy Pond and Rory Williams. The TARDIS crew accidentally find themselves on an Earth-like planet during winter, sometime in the future. There they come into contact with the Ice Warriors, who are seeking a new home for themselves as both Earth and Mars are currently uninhabitable, but complications arise when they discover that this planet is the subject of an Earth terraforming project.

Audio
In the Big Finish audio play Red Dawn, NASA's first manned mission to Mars encounters a small band of surviving Ice Warriors who had been placed in suspended animation to defend the tomb of Izdaal, the greatest warrior of the Martian race. According to this story, previous unmanned Mars probes had brought back fragments of alien technology and DNA, and scientists had gone so far as to create human/Martian hybrid clones. This story, set in the 21st century, appears to depict the first full contact between humans and Ice Warriors. This is difficult to reconcile with The Dying Days, and may support the idea that the novels and audios take place in separate parallel universes.

Another audio play, Frozen Time, sees the Seventh Doctor and a human expedition discovering a group of Ice Warriors frozen in the Antarctic. These are revealed to be criminals deliberately imprisoned there as punishment. Also, The Bride of Peladon saw the Fifth Doctor, Peri and Erimem encountering an Ice Warrior on Peladon, the Ice Warrior investigating the recent death of his sister on Peladon, culminating in him sacrificing his life to trap the Osiran responsible for his sister's death.

The Ice Warriors made an appearance in the Bernice Summerfield audio The Dance of the Dead, and the new gardener on the Braxiatel Collection is an Ice Warrior named Hass.

The Fifth Doctor meets the Ice Warriors yet again in the audio play The Judgement of Isskar. This serves as a sort of origin story for them. The Doctor lands on Mars, looking for a segment of the Key to Time. At this point, Martians are a peaceful communal community who do not even know the meaning of the word "warrior". But, when the segment is taken away, the Martian atmosphere slowly erodes. They become desperate scavengers and, eventually, Ice Warriors.

In the 2010 Deimos / The Resurrection of Mars, it is explained that many Ice Warriors went into cryogenic suspension after Mars was rendered inhospitable. Some of these vaults were on the Martian moon Deimos and others were in the Asteroid Belt. Centuries later, some of these Ice Warriors were revived and eventually discovered a new home world. The planet was a beautiful, civilized utopia called Halcyon. The Ice Warriors killed all of the twenty billion inhabitants and renamed it New Mars. The Doctor's old foe the Monk attempts to wake the Martians up centuries in advance so that they can re-colonise Mars at the cost of the human colonists on the planet at this time, arguing to the Doctor that this will save the inhabitants of Halcyon later. The Doctor prevents this plan to preserve history, but the Monk uses this scheme to manipulate the Doctor's current companion Tamsin to join him (not revealing to Tamsin that he was the reason the Ice Warriors woke up in the first place). 

In Lords of the Red Planet, the Second Doctor encounters the Ice Warriors at an early point of their history. This, along with The Judgment of Isskar, serves as an origin story for the Ice Warriors, with Lords essentially depicting their genetic origin while Judgement depicted their cultural growth. This story is from an unproduced script of Patrick Troughton's final season as the Doctor, re-created by Big Finish Productions. In this version of their origin, the Ice Warriors were the products of genetic engineering by the original inhabitants of Mars to act as a security force, augmenting a race of turtle-like creatures to serve the more lizard-esque Martians, but the research project that created the Ice Warriors was taken over by a psychopath who sought to create her own power base. Guided by the Doctor's example, her Ice Warriors are destroyed through the sacrifice of an early Ice Lord and a prototype Ice Warrior, with only a few examples of the species left alive, leaving it open whether the Ice Warriors depicted here will become the Ice Warrior culture witnessed in the show or if her creations will 'die out' and the familiar species will naturally evolve from the turtle-like creatures later.

In Doctor Who: The Tenth Doctor Adventures Volume Two- Cold Vengeance, the Tenth Doctor and Rose Tyler land on an asteroid that is being used as one of several freezer storage shops for the planet below, but learn that it was created from ice taken from another planet in this system, the other planet having previously been an Ice Warrior colony before the humans destroyed most of its population and forced the survivors to freeze themselves and hide. When a raid on the asteroid turns off the coolant system, a group of Ice Warriors hidden in the ice defrost enough to escape, attempting to crash the asteroid and another spaceship into the planet below in revenge for their past treatment, but the Doctor is able to destroy both asteroid and ship before they can crash. The last Ice Lord learns that some of his people survive on the colony below, living in the ghettos of the human city, but he attempts to destroy the Doctor with his suit's self-destruct systems rather than accept that his vengeance has been for nothing.

Comics
In the Doctor Who comic strip published in the Radio Times in 1996, an Ice Warrior named Ssard became a companion to the Eighth Doctor, together with the human Stacy Townsend. Ssard's introductory strip dealt with a "medieval" period of Mars's history. Stacy and Ssard reappeared in the BBC Books novel Placebo Effect by Gary Russell, where the two were married. In the monthly Doctor Who comic strips, an Ice Warrior named Harma is part of Abslom Daak's Dalek-killing band, the Star Tigers. Another Doctor Who Weekly back-up strip, Deathworld (#15 and #16), featured a conflict between the Ice Warriors and the Cybermen. In the story 4-Dimensional Vistas (Doctor Who Monthly #78-83), the Fifth Doctor and his new companion Gus Goodman discover the Ice Warriors at an Arctic Base, allied with the Meddling Monk and planning to use a giant crystal to create a sonic cannon. The Seventh Doctor faced the Ice Warriors in the comic "A Cold Day in Hell" with Frobisher as the companion. The comic was printed in "Doctor Who Magazine"(130-133).

Appearances

Television
The Ice Warriors (1967)
The Seeds of Death (1969)
The Curse of Peladon (1972)
The Monster of Peladon (1974)
"Cold War" (2013)
"Empress of Mars" (2017)

Cameos
The War Games (1969)
The Mind of Evil (1971)
"Face the Raven" (2015)

Novels

Target Books
Mission to Magnus – Target novelisation of the unmade serial by Philip Martin – 1990

Virgin New Adventures (the Doctor)
Legacy by Gary Russell – 1994
GodEngine by Craig Hinton – 1996
Happy Endings by Paul Cornell – 1996
The Dying Days by Lance Parkin – 1997

Virgin Missing Adventures
The Empire of Glass by Andy Lane – 1995

Virgin New Adventures (Bernice Summerfield)
Beige Planet Mars by Lance Parkin and Mark Clapham – 1998

New Series Adventures
The Silent Stars Go By by Dan Abnett – 2011

Other
Cold (Doctor Who Storybook 2009) by Mark Gatiss – 2008

Audio plays
Red Dawn – 2000
Bang-Bang-a-Boom! (cameo) – 2002
Professor Bernice Summerfield: The Dance of the Dead – 2002
Frozen Time – 2007
The Bride of Peladon – 2008
The Judgement of Isskar – 2009
The Prisoner of Peladon – 2009
Mission to Magnus – 2009, audio adaptation of the unmade serial
Deimos / The Resurrection of Mars – 2010
Thin Ice – 2011, audio adaptation of the unmade serial
Lords of the Red Planet – 2013
Cold Vengeance – 2017
Cry of the Vultriss – 2020
Ice Heist – 2023

Video games
Destiny of the Doctors

References

External links
 
 The Ice Warrior page

Doctor Who races
Fictional warrior races
Fictional Martians
Fictional reptilians